Alom Shaha (born 1973) is a British-Bangladeshi science teacher, writer, and filmmaker. His books include The Young Atheist's Handbook: Lessons for Living a Good Life Without God, Mr Shaha's Recipes for Wonder: adventures in science round the kitchen table, and Mr Shaha's Marvellous Machines: adventures in making round the kitchen table. He has also written for The Guardian, The Big Issue, BBC Science Focus, New Humanist and New Scientist and spoken at events such as the Richmond Literature Festival and Cheltenham Science Festival.

Education and early life
Shaha was born in Bangladesh and grew up in a strict Muslim family in the Elephant and Castle area of London where he developed an interest in atheism.  He was educated at University College London where he was awarded a Bachelor of Science degree in physics, followed by Imperial College London (Master of Science degree in science communication), Goldsmiths, University of London (Master of Arts degree in creative writing and life writing) and King's College London (Postgraduate Certificate in Education (PGCE) Physics).

Career 
Shaha is a teacher of Physics, previously he taught at Camden School for Girls from 2008 to 2020 and The Watford UTC. He was elected a councillor in the 1998 Southwark London Borough Council election for the London Borough of Southwark for the Liberal Democrats. Shaha is a patron of Humanists UK, who have sent his books to secondary schools in the UK. His work has been recognised by fellowships awarded by the National Endowment for Science, Technology and the Arts (NESTA) and the Nuffield Foundation. He has worked on content creation for the BBC and the Royal Institution.

Popular science 
Shaha has published books on popular science aimed at children, teenagers and their families including:
 Mr Shaha's Recipes for Wonder: adventures in science round the kitchen table
 Mr Shaha's Marvellous Machines: adventures in making round the kitchen table
 Why Don't Things Fall Up?: and Other Lost Lessons from Primary School

Textbooks 
Shaha has co-authored textbooks on GCSE Science and A-Level Physics for the AQA examination board published by Oxford University Press:

 Oxford Revise: AQA GCSE Physics
 Oxford Revise: AQA A-Level Physics 
 Oxford Revise: AQA GCSE Combined Science

Media 
Alongside appearances on YouTube, Shaha's appearances on mainstream media have included:
 Science Shack
 What the Victorians Did for Us 
 Horizon

Personal life
Shaha speaks the Sylheti language fluently having been born in a small village in the Sylhet Division of Bangladesh.

References 

Living people
21st-century British writers
English humanists
Liberal Democrats (UK) councillors
21st-century British educators
1973 births